Üçler (Laz language: Hekoleni Pici) is a village in the Arhavi District, Artvin Province, Turkey. Its population is 83 (2021).

References

Villages in Arhavi District
Laz settlements in Turkey